There are at least six named mountains in Petroleum County, Montana.

 Dog Butte, el. 
 Dovetail Butte, el. 
 Duff Hill, el. 
 Rattlesnake Butte, el. 
 Three Buttes, el. 
 Tin Can Hill, el.

See also
 List of mountains in Montana
 List of mountain ranges in Montana

Notes

Landforms of Petroleum County, Montana
Petroleum